The 1962 Newfoundland general election was held on 19 November 1962 to elect members of the 33rd General Assembly of Newfoundland. It was won by the Liberal party.

Results

*As Newfoundland Democratic Party.

References

Further reading
 

Elections in Newfoundland and Labrador
1962 elections in Canada
1962 in Newfoundland and Labrador
November 1962 events in Canada